Ihor Sikorsky Kyiv International Airport (Zhuliany)  is one of the two passenger airports of the Ukrainian capital Kyiv, the other being Boryspil International Airport (also used for Kyiv). Aside from facilitating regular passenger flights, Kyiv International Airport is also the main business aviation airport in Ukraine, and one of the busiest business aviation hubs in Europe.

History

Early years
The airport began in 1923 as a military airfield co-used by the Ukrpovitroshlyakh (Ukrainian Society of Air Communications), Ukraine's earliest civil aviation company, which in 1934 was integrated into Aeroflot as the latter's regional administration. The airport terminal was built only after World War II in 1949. Until the 1960s, Zhuliany was the only passenger airport serving Kyiv.

In 1959, the larger Boryspil International Airport was built near the city of Boryspil, gradually replacing Zhuliany as the main airport serving Kyiv. Since that time the old "Kyiv" airport became commonly known just as "Zhuliany" (or Kyiv-Zhuliany) and was used for Soviet domestic flights only.

International flights and traffic revival
After Ukraine gained independence in 1991, Zhuliany began receiving international flights from nearby countries (first from its former Soviet "domestic" destinations), increasingly so since the 2000s when Ukraine's civil aviation started booming. On 27 March 2011, Wizz Air, a European low-cost airline, moved all its operations to Zhuliany from Boryspil, bringing around-the-clock flights to the airport and increasing passenger traffic by 15 to 20%.

In 2012, the airport managed to survive the European cold wave without major flight delays or cancellations.

Surrounded by major railways, highways and residential districts, the airport has limited possibilities to expand its runway. Therefore, it is limited in the weight of aircraft that are allowed to fly in the airport (currently up to Boeing 737/Airbus A320 type). In 2013, the airport declared plans to expand the runway for additional 150 m, although stressing complete safety and operability of its current length. Other parts of the airport infrastructure are also being developed. The new "A" terminal opened on 17 May 2012, now receives all international and some domestic flights. Projects for expanding Zhuliany's taxiways and aircraft parking lots are being considered as well.

Recent developments
In the first half of 2013, the airport's passenger traffic rose 2.7-fold (to 816,757 passengers per year) since the beginning of the year, including 4.2-fold growth of the domestic traffic. According to the media and industry experts, once underdog Zhuliany Airport has rapidly grown into a major, and more efficient, competitor to the country's leading Boryspil Airport. 

As of July 2013, Moscow, Treviso and Dortmund were the most popular international destinations from the airport, with Simferopol, Donetsk and Odessa leading among domestic destinations. Also in 2013, the airport opened a new domestic terminal and a new business terminal, with currently 3 terminals in service.

In March 2015, Wizz Air Ukraine announced that it would cease operations leading to the cancellation of several routes from their base at the airport. Only some of their former routes were taken over by its parent, Wizz Air, though the airline has since expanded its flight network from the airport, with twenty destinations to be served by August 2017.

Between 14 and 24 May 2017, the airport was closed for runway improvement work.

On 22 March 2018, the Kyiv City Council officially renamed the airport International Airport "Kyiv" (Zhulyany) Igor Sikorsky in honor of Igor Sikorsky.

On 24 February 2022, five explosions erupted as part of the 2022 Russian invasion of Ukraine. On the same day, Ukraine closed airspace to civilian flights.

Airlines and destinations
The following airlines operate regular scheduled and charter flights to and from Kyiv International Airport (Zhuliany):

As of 24 February 2022, all passenger flights have been suspended indefinitely.

Neighboring aviation facilities
 A major aircraft maintenance, repair and overhaul company, the so-called Kyiv Aircraft Repair Plant 410, adjoins the airport.

 In 2003, the Ukraine State Aviation Museum was created in one of the industrial estates neighboring the airport. It is the largest aviation museum in Ukraine, exhibiting some unique Soviet examples including original prototypes for famous airliners.

Statistics

Ground transportation

Road
The airport is connected to the city's main highway infrastructure via Povitroflotskyi Avenue and served by a number of city transport routes, including:
 Trolleybus Route 22: 'Kyiv' Airport-Olzhycha Street (transfer for metro at Dorohozhychi Station – )
 Bus Route 78: 'Kyiv' Airport-Vasylkivska Metro Station (transfer for metro – )
As well as private bus routes. Car parking facilities at the airport itself are limited, but long-term parking can be found in the airport's immediate vicinity. Taxis can often be found waiting directly outside the terminal, in the passenger drop-off/pick-up area.

Rail
The airport's old passenger terminal is located about 0.5 km away from the Kyiv-Volynskyi rail station – a stop for elektrichka commuter trains as well as for the intracity Urban Electric Train service.

See also
 List of airports in Ukraine
 List of the busiest airports in Ukraine
 List of the busiest airports in Europe
 List of the busiest airports in the former USSR
 Denis Kostrzhevskiy, the airport's chairman

References

External links

 Official website of the airport 
 
 

Airports in Kyiv
Airports established in 1923
1923 establishments in Ukraine
Holosiivskyi District